Kyle Richardson (born April 22, 1978) is an American football coach who is currently the passing game coordinator and tight ends coach at Clemson University. He previously served as the head coach at Northwestern High School in Rock Hill, South Carolina from 2011 to 2015.

In 2016, Richardson joined Clemson University as a senior offensive assistant, he served in that role from 2016 to 2020. In 2020, he was promoted to director of player development, previously held by Brad Scott who left to join his son, Jeff Scott, at the University of South Florida.  On December 10, 2021, Richardson was formally named as Clemson’s passing game coordinator and tight ends coach.

Some of the prominent players Richardson has helped develop include Jared Cook, Cordarrelle Patterson, Justin Worley, Mason Rudolph, and Davis Allen.

Early life and education
Richardson attended South Point High School in Belmont, North Carolina and earned his undergraduate degree from Appalachian State University in 2001 and has two Master’s degrees, including a Master’s from California University and Clemson University.

Coaching career

Northwestern HS
In 2007, Richardson was hired as the offensive coordinator at Northwestern High School in Rock Hill, South Carolina under head coach Jimmy Wallace.

In 2011, Richardson was named the head coach Northwestern High School. During his tenure as head coach, Richardson led the Trojans to a 58–13 record, including four region championships, three state title game appearances and state championships in both 2013 and 2015. On March 18, 2016, Richardson announced his resignation.

Clemson
In 2016, Richardson joined Clemson University as a senior offensive assistant.

On December 10, 2021, Richardson was promoted to passing game coordinator and tight ends coach, replacing Brandon Streeter and Tony Elliott, respectively.

References

External links
Clemson Tigers bio

1978 births
Living people
Clemson Tigers football coaches
Appalachian State University alumni
Clemson University alumni